Zaide Silvia Gutiérrez (born November 2, 1958) is a Mexican actress whose breakout role was the 1983 film El Norte.

Gutiérrez attended the National Autonomous University of Mexico, and graduated with a Bachelor of Arts, with highest honors, in Dramatic Literature and Theater. Her graduate work includes Theater Directing (Columbia University), Russian Literature, and Mexican Literature (National Autonomous University of Mexico). She graduated with a double major in Mexican Literature and Film Direction at the Ivy League stated above.

Since her debut in El Norte, Zaide appeared in over 35 feature films in Mexico, a country with a robust film industry.

She has appeared in two films by director Alex Cox, El Patrullero in 1991 and Death and the Compass in 1996. She also received a nomination for the Ariel Award for Best Supporting Actress for Por Si No Te Vuelvo a Ver in 1998.

In addition, she has appeared in many widely popular Latin American telenovelas, television productions, and both acts in and directs theatre.

Gutiérrez appeared in Gregory Nava's Bordertown in 2007.

Filmography

Awards
 Ariel Award: Nominated for four awards in Mexican films.
 Mexican Cinema Journalists Award: Won two awards in Mexican films.
 The Association of Latin Entertainment Critics: Won one award.

Footnotes

External links
 .

1959 births
Living people
Mexican film actresses
Mexican telenovela actresses
National Autonomous University of Mexico alumni
Actresses from Mexico City
Columbia University School of the Arts alumni